Mingiyan Arturovich Semyonov (born 11 June 1990) is a Russian wrestler of Kalmyk descent, who won the bronze medal at the 2012 Summer Olympics in the Greco-Roman 55 kg event. His twin brother Sanal Semenov competes in the same event alongside his brother. He is also the 2016 European Champion and a World Championship silver medalist.

References

External links
 

1990 births
Living people
People from Kalmykia
Kalmyk sportspeople
Russian male sport wrestlers
Olympic wrestlers of Russia
Wrestlers at the 2012 Summer Olympics
Olympic bronze medalists for Russia
Olympic medalists in wrestling
Medalists at the 2012 Summer Olympics
World Wrestling Championships medalists
Sportspeople from Kalmykia
European Wrestling Championships medalists